My Lady Boss is a Filipino romantic comedy film directed by Jade Castro, and starring Richard Gutierrez and Marian Rivera. It is produced by  GMA Pictures together with Regal Films. The film was supposed to have premiered on April 8, 2013, but after a series of postponed showings, it was released nationwide on July 3, 2013.

Plot 
Zach (Gutierrez) is a rich boy forced to find and keep a job after a major blunder in a company he set up. He ends up working for Evelyn, whom he discovers to be the boss from hell. In the long run, he sees her for who and what she really is. Meanwhile, Evelyn (Rivera) is an uptight and tough Brand Manager who hires an assistant Brand Manager. When she finds herself dumped by her boyfriend, Evelyn seeks comfort in Zach, her assistant who shows a different side of him. As they get to know each other more and as their encounters become more intimate, they begin to ask themselves if what they feel for each other is for real. The problem is romance between boss and subordinate in a company is not allowed. Things get complicated when an office romance develops between the unlikely pair.

Cast 
Marian Rivera as Evelyn "EVL" Vallejo Lontoc
Richard Gutierrez as Zach Rhys Strella
Rocco Nacino as Henry "HPE" Posadas Enrile
Tom Rodriguez as Timothy "Tim" Espalto
Sandy Andolong as Myrna Lontoc
Sef Cadayona as Nonoy
Ronaldo Valdez as Carlos Strella
Matet De Leon as Ruby
Jace Flores as Leo
Ruru Madrid as Elvin Lontoc
Betong Sumaya as Sponky
Dion Ignacio as Eugene Lontoc
Kathleen Hermosa as Edna Lontoc
Patricia Ysmael as Aya
Jackielou Blanco as Diana
Pinky Amador as Liza
Regine Tolentino as Lydia
Andrea Torres as Ana Soriano-Espalto
Mikey Bustos as Norman
Chloe McCully as Chancy
Benjie Paras as Rammy
Victor Aliwalas as Jay
Gerard Pizzaras as Andres
Petra Mahalimuyak as Kai
Maricel Laxa as Lorna "LOV" Ongpauco-Villega

Background and development 
The film was first announced by the lead actress, Marian Rivera on December 3, 2012, during an interview with Philippine Entertainment Portal. It is going to be the second film which stars Rivera and actor Richard Gutierrez together following the My Best Friend's Girlfriend produced by the same film outfit in 2008. On a set visit by Samantha Portillo of GMA Network, Gutierrez states that "..after 5 years, finally, we get to do a movie", while Rivera says that her working relationship with Richard is better than ever. On an interview on The Philippine Star, Gutierrez talked about the film saying "..It's entertaining and light. It feels good doing a movie of this type again. I was looking forward to this movie after Seduction. We enjoy doing the movie. Although the acting is serious, it is lighter." He further added that the film, though still a romantic-comedy, is more mature than BFGF(My Besftriend's Girlfriend).

Originally, it is slated for February 13, 2013, film date but was pushed back because of scheduling issues. According to an article published by "Filipinas in Showbiz", the film is very much alike with Hollywood film, The Proposal(2009) produced by Mandeville Films. An assumption which proved to be inaccurate because the story of My Lady Boss is not similar to the Proposal, other than the leading actress is the boss of the leading actor.  The Proposal is a film about a Canadian lady Executive working in the United States who is forced to pretend to be engaged to her American assistant so that she will not be deported back to Canada.  My Lady Boss, on the other hand is about a failed young businessman who is forced to seek employment to get back to the good graces of his disappointed rich grandfather. In January 2013, two short teasers were shown on television, but it was removed on-air after its playdate pushback. The full trailer was first released on the #PPSummerShake episode of Sunday variety show, Party Pilipinas. The theme song for the movie is a new rendition by Aicelle Santos and Gian Magdangal to "I'll Never Go" originally sung by Nexxus. An acoustic version by Rita Iringan and a band version by Kristofer Martin will also be used on the film.

Filming 
The film is set on various locations in the Philippines, with majority of sets in Fairlane, West Fairview, Quezon City.

Release and box office status 
The film was originally slated for a February 14, 2013, release date but it was postponed to April 10, 2013, because production failed to finish shooting the movie on time. But GMA Films moved it again because it would conflict with several Hollywood Summer Blockbuster releases. The movie was finally shown on July 3, 2013.

The film grossed P19.45 million after its two weeks of showing.

References

External links 
 

2013 films
2013 romantic comedy films
GMA Pictures films
Regal Entertainment films
2010s Tagalog-language films
Philippine romantic comedy films
2010s English-language films
Films directed by Jade Castro